The National War Memorial in front of the Parliament complex is dedicated to all military personnel killed since World War I and police personal killed due to militancy.

An annual ceremony to commemorate the velour and gallantry of War Heroes is held at the site on Remembrance Day of May.

See also
 Remembrance Day (Sri Lanka)

References
Nation Jointly Salutes Our Liberators on War Heroes Day

Sri Lankan military memorials and cemeteries
Buildings and structures in Sri Jayawardenepura Kotte